The 1995 Boston Marathon was the 99th running of the annual marathon race in Boston, United States, which was held on April 17. The elite men's race was won by Kenya's Cosmas Ndeti in a time of 2:09:22 hours and the women's race was won by Germany's Uta Pippig in 2:25:11.

A total of 8258 people finished the race, 6409 men and 1849 women.

Results

Men

Women

References

Results. Association of Road Racing Statisticians. Retrieved 2020-04-14.

External links
 Boston Athletic Association website

Boston Marathon
Boston
Boston Marathon
Marathon
Boston Marathon